The 2019 Bihar floods affected 13 districts of North Bihar, India, causing 130 deaths by the end of July. 1269 panchayats (settlement councils) under 92 blocks of 13 districts of Northern Bihar were severely affected in the flood. Around 88.46 lakhs (8.846 million) people were affected.

Events

13 Affected districts 
Araria, Kishanganj, Madhubani, East Champaran, Sitamarhi, Sheohar, Supaul, Darbhanga, Muzaffarpur, Saharsa, Katihar, West Champaran.

District wise human lives lost. 
As per Bihar Disaster Management Department, no death was reported from West Champaran and Katihar from the flood-hit districts.

2019 Patna floods
There was heavy waterlogging in Patna in August-September 2019. More than 30 people lost their lives due to floods, heavy rains and water logging. The flash flooding in Patna was the result of Ganga River overflowing following heavy monsoon rains. Patna city was filled with water for several days even after the rain stopped due to a sewer blockage. In many areas of Patna, 6 to 7 feet of water has accumulated on the roads. This was the worst flood in Patna since 1975.

References

External links
 Patna Floods In Rain Fury
 Bihar, Eastern UP Flooded After Heavy Rain

Floods in India
2019 disasters in India